Staggerweed or stagger weed, a plant so named because it produces staggers in livestock that graze it, usually refers to Stachys arvensis.

It can also refer to other plants including:
Consolida regalis syn. Delphinium consolida
Corydalis cava
Delphinium spp.
Delphinium tricorne
Dicentra eximia syn. Fumaria eximia
Dicentra canadensis
Dicentra cucullaria
Helenium autumnale
Jacobaea vulgaris syn. Senecio jacobaea, also called staggerwort